Jens Dekker (born 13 December 1998) is a Dutch male cyclo-cross cyclist, who last rode for UCI Continental team . He won the gold medal in the men's junior event at the 2016 UCI Cyclo-cross World Championships in Heusden-Zolder.

Major results

2014–2015
 1st Junior Mol
 UCI Junior World Cup
2nd Heusden-Zolder
 Junior Bpost Bank Trophy
2nd Baal
3rd Koppenberg
 2nd Junior Overijse
 3rd National Junior Championships
 Junior Superprestige
3rd Zonhoven
2015–2016
 1st  UCI World Junior Championships
 1st  UEC European Junior Championships
 1st  National Junior Championships
 1st  Overall UCI Junior World Cup
1st Koksijde
1st Hoogerheide
2nd Cauberg
2nd Namur
 1st Overall Junior Superprestige
1st Gieten
1st Zonhoven
1st Gavere
1st Hoogstraten
1st Middelkerke
2nd Diegem
 Junior Bpost Bank Trophy
1st Ronse
1st Sint-Niklaas
 Junior Brico Cross
1st Hulst
1st Kruibeke
 1st Junior Erpe-Mere
 1st Junior Oostmalle
2016–2017
 Under-23 DVV Trophy
2nd Koppenberg
2017–2018
 Under-23 Superprestige
1st Gieten
1st Zonhoven
1st Ruddervoorde
3rd Hoogstraten
3rd Middelkerke
 Under-23 DVV Trophy
2nd Ronse
3rd Koppenberg
3rd Lille
2018–2019
 Under-23 Brico Cross
1st Ronse
 UCI Under-23 World Cup
3rd Koksijde
2019–2020
 Under-23 DVV Trophy
1st Koppenberg

References

External links
 Profile at cyclingarchives.com

1998 births
Living people
Cyclo-cross cyclists
Dutch male cyclists
People from Hoogeveen
Cyclists from Drenthe
21st-century Dutch people